The Mangangate River, also referred to as the Alabang–Cupang River, is a river system in Muntinlupa, Philippines. It is one of 21 major tributaries of Laguna de Bay.

The first is connected to the drainage system of Ayala Alabang, while the second is connected with the headwater from the New Bilibid Prison (NBP) Reservation, near Camp Sampaguita. This second branch flows through at Ayala Alabang Village and Filinvest City, and connects with the first branch at the Pasong Diablo site until it drains out into Laguna de Bay at a point between Wawa, Alabang and Purok 1, Cupang.

The river system has four adjoining creeks:
 Two creeks join the mainstream at the Filinvest site; and
 At the NBP Reservation, one creek spans .

Sources

See also
 Laguna de Bay
 Laguna Lake Development Authority

Rivers of Metro Manila
Tributaries of Laguna de Bay